HMS Acheron was the name ship of the Acheron-class destroyer of the British Royal Navy. She is named after the River Acheron, believed in Greek Mythology to be a branch of the River Styx. She was the fifth ship of the Royal Navy to bear the name.

Pennant numbers

Construction
With her sister, Ariel, she was a "Thornycroft special", and as such was slightly longer and more powerful than the standard destroyer of her class. Acheron was ordered during the building programme of 1910–11, laid down at the Woolston yard of John I. Thornycroft & Company, and launched on 27 June 1911.

Career
Serving with the First Destroyer Flotilla, she became part of the Grand Fleet at the outbreak of war.

The Battle of Heligoland Bight
She was present with First Destroyer Flotilla on 28 August 1914 at the Battle of Heligoland Bight, led by the light cruiser Fearless.

The Battle of Dogger Bank
On 24 January 1915 the First Destroyer Flotilla, including Acheron were present at the Battle of Dogger Bank, led by the light cruiser Aurora.

Sinking of U-12
On 10 March 1915, in company with her sisters Attack and Ariel, Acheron was searching for a German submarine reported by the trawler Man Island near Aberdeen. At 10:10am Attack sighted U-12 and opened fire. She turned to ram, sighting the conning tower under the water in the final moments before she struck the submarine at a fine angle. Within two minutes the submarine had returned to the surface so that the crew could escape, but they found the conning tower hatch jammed, and most of the survivors managed their escape via the other hatches. Acheron and the other destroyers opened fire as the submarine lay on the surface, killing and injuring some of the escaping sailors. At 10:30am U-12 sank approximately in position , and the destroyers picked up 10 survivors; 19 lives had been lost. The damage to Ariels bows was so serious that she had to be towed into port.

The Battle of Jutland
Acheron served at Battle of Jutland on 31 May 1916 as part of her flotilla.

Mediterranean service
From 1917 the Third Battle Squadron was deployed to the Mediterranean. Acheron was present at the entry of the Allied fleet through the Dardanelles on 12 November 1918.

Disposal

Acheron was sold on 9 May 1921  to Ward for breaking.  She was sold again on 20 September 1923 to J J King.

References

External links 
 
 Imperial War Museums: Lives of the First World War: HMS Acheron at the Battle of Jutland (Crew List)
Battle of Jutland Crew Lists Project - HMS Acheron Crew List

Acheron-class destroyers of the Royal Navy
Ships built in Southampton
1911 ships
World War I destroyers of the United Kingdom
Ships built by John I. Thornycroft & Company